Carl Ludwig Wilhelm Grolman, since 1812 von Grolmann, (* July 23, 1775 in Giessen; † February 14, 1829 in Darmstadt) was Jurist and Grand Duchy of Hesse Minister-President.

1775 births
1829 deaths
People from Giessen
Jurists from Hesse
German untitled nobility
Ministers-President of Hesse
Von Grolman family